Betty L. Siegel (January 24, 1931 – February 11, 2020) was an author and president of Kennesaw State University.  She was the first female president of the University System of Georgia. She served in that position for 25 years, making her the longest serving female president of a state university in the United States.

In 2007 Siegel was President Emeritus and Distinguished Chair of Leadership, Ethics & Character at Kennesaw State University.

Education
Siegel was born Betty Faye Lentz in Cumberland, Kentucky to Carl N. and Vera (Hogg) Lentz. She received her bachelor's degree from Wake Forest, a master's degree from the University of North Carolina, a Ph.D. in Education from Florida State University and post-doctoral studies at Indiana University. She held five honorary doctorates.

Career
Assistant professor, Lenoir Rhyne College, Hickory, North Carolina, 1956–59; associate professor, 1961–64;
Assistant professor, University of Florida, Gainesville, 1967–70, associate professor, 1970–72, professor, 1973–76, Dean academy affairs for continuing education, 1972–76;
Dean, School of Education and Psychology, Western Carolina University, Cullowhee, North Carolina, 1976–81;
President Kennesaw State University, Kennesaw, Georgia, 1981-2006.
President Emeritus and Distinguished Chair of Leadership, Ethics and Character Kennesaw State University, Kennesaw, Georgia, 2006–2020.
Co-founder of the International Alliance for Invitational Education (http://www.invitationaleducation.net)
Convener of the Oxford Conclaves on Global Ethical Leadership
Board of Directors, Character Education Partnership, 2008–2020

References

External links
Biography

1931 births
2020 deaths
People from Cumberland, Kentucky
Presidents of Kennesaw State University
Florida State University alumni
University of Florida faculty
Kentucky women in education
Kentucky women writers
Women heads of universities and colleges
American women academics
21st-century American women